Jean-Louis Brost (born 30 May 1951) is a French former professional footballer who played as a forward.

Club career 
Brost began his career at Stade Saint-Germain, the predecessor of Paris Saint-Germain. When PSG was formed in 1970, he joined the newly-introduced club. He would go on to make 93 appearances and score 20 goals in all competitions across four seasons. In 1974, Brost signed for Fontainebleau. However, after two years there, he retired from football.

International career 
Brost was an amateur international for France.

After football 
Later in Brost’s life, he became production director at Daniel Hechter Paris. He would also become executive director at RC Paris.

Honours 
Paris Saint-Germain
 Division 2: 1970–71

References

External links 
 
 

1951 births
Living people
French footballers
Footballers from Paris
Association football forwards
Stade Saint-Germain players
Paris Saint-Germain F.C. players
Entente Bagneaux-Fontainebleau-Nemours players
French Division 3 (1971–1993) players
Ligue 2 players
Ligue 1 players
French football chairmen and investors
Championnat de France Amateur (1935–1971) players
France amateur international footballers